The High Commissioner of Malaysia to the Republic of Kenya is the head of Malaysia's diplomatic mission to Kenya. The position has the rank and status of an Ambassador Extraordinary and Plenipotentiary and is based in the High Commission of Malaysia, Nairobi.

List of heads of mission

High Commissioners to Kenya

See also
 Kenya–Malaysia relations

References 

 
Kenya
Malaysia